Lucifuga simile is a species of cavefish in the family Bythitidae. It is endemic to Cuba. It is a demersal species found in freshwater and brackish water. It can reach a length of 8.8 centimeters.

References

The FishBase 2010. .

Bythitidae
Endemic fauna of Cuba
Freshwater fish of Cuba
Cave fish
Taxonomy articles created by Polbot
Fish described in 1981
Taxa named by Teodor T. Nalbant